Thomas Albert Dallison-Lisbon (born 2 February 1996) is an English footballer who plays as a central defender for Colchester United.

Early life
Dallison was born in Dagenham.

Career
Dallison began his career playing the youth teams at West Ham United and Arsenal before signing a contract with Brighton & Hove Albion in October 2013 following a successful trial. He spent time out on loan at non-league sides Dartford and Braintree Town in 2015. In February 2016 he joined League Two side Crawley Town on loan. He made his professional debut on 20 February 2016 in a 1–1 draw against Plymouth Argyle, but broke his foot after 60 minutes, ruling him out for the rest of the season.

On 18 July 2016, Dallison joined League Two club Cambridge United on a loan deal lasting until 8 January 2017.

In August 2017 he joined Accrington Stanley on loan, He scored his first goal for Accrington in an EFL Cup tie against West Bromwich Albion on 22 August 2017, and in January 2018 he returned to Brighton.

In May 2018, Dallison signed a pre-contract agreement with Scottish Championship club Falkirk.

He signed for Crawley Town in January 2019. In January 2020, Dallison extended his contract with Crawley until the end of the 2021–22 season.

On 6 January 2022, Dallison signed a two and half year contract with Colchester United for an undisclosed fee.

Career statistics

References

External links

1996 births
Living people
English footballers
English Football League players
West Ham United F.C. players
Arsenal F.C. players
Brighton & Hove Albion F.C. players
Dartford F.C. players
Braintree Town F.C. players
Crawley Town F.C. players
Cambridge United F.C. players
Falkirk F.C. players
Colchester United F.C. players
National League (English football) players
Scottish Professional Football League players
Association football defenders